Sven Pippig (27 May 1963 – 25 September 2013) was a German actor. He appeared in more than sixty films from 1993 to 2013.

Selected filmography

References

External links 

1963 births
2013 deaths
German male film actors